Waradgery Shire was a local government area in the Riverina region of New South Wales, Australia.

Waradgery Shire was established in 1906 and its offices were based in the town of Hay, New South Wales. 

In 1965 Waradgery Shire was merged with the Municipality of Hay to form Hay Shire.

References

Former local government areas of New South Wales
1906 establishments in Australia
1965 disestablishments in Australia